Jyotinder Singh Randhawa (born 4 May 1972) is an Indian professional golfer. He plays on the Asian Tour where he won eight times between 1998 and 2009. He was ranked in the top 100 of the Official World Golf Ranking several times between 2004 and 2009.

Professional career
Randhawa turned professional in 1994. He played on the Asian Tour, having played on the European Tour from 2005 to 2010. In 2002, he finished top on the Asian Tour money list. He has finished second on the European Tour three times; the 2002 BMW Asian Open, the 2004 Johnnie Walker Classic and the 2007 Open de España.

Personal life
Randhawa was married to actress Chitrangada Singh. Their son is named Zorawar Randhawa. The couple divorced in April 2014 and their son's custody has been granted to Chitrangada.

He was arrested in connection with poaching of endangered animals and birds in Katarniaghat wildlife sanctuary on 26 December 2018.

Professional wins (23)

Japan Golf Tour wins (1)

Asian Tour wins (8)

Asian Tour playoff record (3–0)

Professional Golf Tour of India wins (8)

Other wins (6)
1999 Wills Southern Open  
2000 Xerox Open, Honda Siel Nike-PGA Cship, SRF Open
2003 Kashmir Open
2005 Hero Honda Open South

Results in major championships

Note: Randhawa never played in the Masters Tournament.

CUT = missed the half-way cut
WD = withdrew
"T" = tied

Results in World Golf Championships

"T" = Tied
Note that the HSBC Champions did not become a WGC event until 2009.

Team appearances
Amateur
Eisenhower Trophy (representing India): 1992

Professional
Alfred Dunhill Cup (representing India): 1999
Dynasty Cup (representing Asia): 2003 (winners), 2005 (winners)
World Cup (representing India): 2005, 2007, 2008, 2009
Royal Trophy (representing Asia): 2006

See also
List of golfers with most Asian Tour wins

References

External links

Indian male golfers
Asian Tour golfers
European Tour golfers
Golfers at the 1994 Asian Games
Asian Games competitors for India
Golfers from Delhi
Recipients of the Arjuna Award
People from New Delhi
People from Meerut
1972 births
Living people